Tibor Tisza (born 10 November 1984) is a Hungarian footballer.

Career
Tisza started to play football in his hometown, Debrecen but played only in the reserve team of Debreceni VSC. In 2004, he was signed by Diósgyőr, where he spent the 2004–05 season and the autumn season of 2005–06. He then went on to join Újpest FC in January 2006.

On 17 August 2009 Tisza signed a contract for Royal Antwerp FC, being on loan for one year. He scored in his debut against Lierse S.K.

Honours
 Hungary U21 Player of the Year: 2006
 Player of the Year in Royal Antwerp FC 2009–10

References

External links
Tibor Tisza profile at magyarfutball.hu

1984 births
Living people
Sportspeople from Debrecen
Hungarian footballers
Association football forwards
Hungary international footballers
Diósgyőri VTK players
Újpest FC players
Royal Antwerp F.C. players
Sint-Truidense V.V. players
Debreceni VSC players
Nemzeti Bajnokság I players
Hungarian expatriate footballers
Expatriate footballers in Belgium
Hungarian expatriate sportspeople in Belgium
Association football midfielders